Micromyrtus flaviflora is a plant species of the family Myrtaceae endemic to Western Australia.

It blooms between January and November producing white or purple-pink or yellow flowers.

It is found on sand dunes and sand plains in the Mid West, Pilbara and  Goldfields-Esperance regions of Western Australia extending into the Northern Territory where it grows in sandy soils.

References

flaviflora
Endemic flora of Western Australia
Myrtales of Australia
Rosids of Western Australia
Taxa named by Ferdinand von Mueller
Plants described in 1926